Kristen Jeannine Dalton-Wolfe (born December 13, 1986) is an American actress, model and beauty pageant titleholder who won Miss USA 2009 and represented the United States at the Miss Universe 2009 pageant.

Personal life
Dalton is the daughter of Jeannine Dalton (née Boger), who was Miss North Carolina USA 1982.  Her younger sister, Kenzie, also competed in the Miss North Carolina Teen USA pageant, and placed 1st runner-up. The third Dalton sister, Julia, was Miss North Carolina Teen USA 2008 and placed second runner-up at Miss Teen USA 2008. Julia won the title of Miss North Carolina USA 2015 and competed at Miss USA 2015.  

Dalton graduated from Hoggard High School and was an Honors psychology and Spanish major at East Carolina University.

She dated Reid Rosenthal, who appeared in the fifth season of The Bachelorette, but the couple broke up in March 2012.

In 2009, Dalton appeared on Are You Smarter Than a 5th Grader as a contestant.

She is a public advocate for Children International.

Dalton is the creator and founder of She is MORE, an online faith-based magazine, which claims to have 400,000 readers visit the site every month.

Dalton is the host of Hot Off the Press on JUCE TV, TBN's sister network for millennials. 

She is married to Kris Wolfe.

Pageants

Miss North Carolina USA 2009
Dalton won the Miss North Carolina USA 2009 title in a state pageant held in High Point, North Carolina produced by RPM Productions in November 2008. She previously placed first runner-up to Nikkie Groat in the Miss North Carolina Teen USA 2005 pageant.

Miss USA 2009
Dalton represented North Carolina in the Miss USA 2009 pageant broadcast live from Planet Hollywood in Las Vegas, Nevada, where she became the second Miss North Carolina USA to win the Miss USA title; the state's only prior winner was Chelsea Cooley, Miss USA 2005. Dalton won both the swimsuit and evening gown competitions during the final pageant competition, and was crowned by former titleholder Crystle Stewart of Texas.

Miss Universe 2009
Dalton represented the United States in the Miss Universe 2009 pageant, held at the Atlantis Paradise Island Resort in the Bahamas. She finished in 10th place overall.

References

External links
Miss North Carolina USA official website
Miss USA official website

1986 births
Living people
Actors from Wilmington, North Carolina
East Carolina University alumni
Beauty pageant contestants from North Carolina
Miss North Carolina USA winners
Miss USA 2009 delegates
Miss USA winners
Miss Universe 2009 contestants
American beauty pageant winners